June is the sixth month of the year in the Julian and Gregorian calendars and is the second of four months to have a length of 30 days, and the third of five months to have a length of less than 31 days. June contains the summer solstice in the Northern Hemisphere, the day with the most daylight hours, and the winter solstice in the Southern Hemisphere, the day with the fewest daylight hours (excluding polar regions in both cases). June in the Northern Hemisphere is the seasonal equivalent to December in the Southern Hemisphere and vice versa. In the Northern Hemisphere, the beginning of the traditional astronomical summer is 21 June (meteorological summer begins on 1 June). In the Southern Hemisphere, meteorological winter begins on 1 June.

At the start of June, the sun rises in the constellation of Taurus; at the end of June, the sun rises in the constellation of Gemini. However, due to the precession of the equinoxes, June begins with the sun in the astrological sign of Gemini, and ends with the sun in the astrological sign of Cancer.

Etymology and history 

The Latin name for June is Junius. Ovid offers multiple etymologies for the name in the Fasti, a poem about the Roman calendar. The first is that the month is named after the Roman goddess Juno, the goddess of marriage and the wife of the supreme deity Jupiter;  the second is that the name comes from the Latin word iuniores, meaning "younger ones", as opposed to maiores ("elders") for which the preceding month May (Maius) may be named.
Another source claims June is named after Lucius Junius Brutus, founder of the Roman Republic and ancestor of the Roman gens Junia.

In ancient Rome, the period from mid-May through mid-June was considered inauspicious for marriage. Ovid says that he consulted the Flaminica Dialis, the high priestess of Jupiter, about setting a date for his daughter's wedding, and was advised to wait till after June 15. Plutarch, however, implies that the entire month of June was more favorable for weddings than May.

Certain meteor showers take place in June. The Arietids  takes place May 22 to July 2 each year, and peaks on June 7. The Beta Taurids June 5 to July 18. The June Bootids take place roughly between 26 June and 2 July each year.

Ancient Roman observances 
Under the calendar of ancient Rome, the festival of Ludi Fabarici took place on May 29 – June 1, Kalendae Fabariae took place on June 1, the Festival to Bellona took place on June 3, Ludi Piscatorii took place on June 7, and Vestalia took place from June 7 – June 15. A Rosalia was held on June 20. The Secular Games were held roughly every 100 years in either May or June.  These dates do not correspond to the modern Gregorian calendar.

Observances

Month-long observances 
 African-American Music Appreciation Month (officially recognized by the United States)
 ALS Awareness Month (Canada)
 Caribbean American Heritage Month (United States)
 Crop over (Barbados), celebrated until the first Monday in August.
 Great Outdoors Month (United States)
 LGBTQ+ Awareness and Pride month
 Month of the Most Sacred Heart of Jesus (Catholic tradition)
 National Oceans Month (United States)
 National Smile Month (United Kingdom)
 PTSD Awareness Month (United States)
 Season of Emancipation (April 14 to August 23) (Barbados)

Non-Gregorian observances, 2019 
(All Baha'i, Islamic, and Jewish observances begin at the sundown prior to the date listed, and end at sundown of the date in question unless otherwise noted.)
 List of observances set by the Bahá'í calendar
 List of observances set by the Chinese calendar
 List of observances set by the Hebrew calendar
 List of observances set by the Islamic calendar
 List of observances set by the Solar Hijri calendar

Moveable observances 
 Phi Ta Khon (Dan Sai, Loei province, Isan, Thailand) Dates are selected by village mediums and can take place anywhere between March and July.
 See also Movable Western Christian observances
 See also Movable Eastern Christian observances

By other date

First Tuesday 
 International Children's Day

First Wednesday 
 Global Running Day
 World Bicycle Day

First Friday 
 Labour Day (Bahamas)
 National Doughnut Day (United States)

First Saturday 
 Birthday of the Yang di-Pertuan Agong (Malaysia)
 National Trails Day (United States)
 Saiō Matsuri (Meiwa, Mie, Japan)

First Sunday 
 Armed Forces Day (Canada)
 Children's Day (United States)
 Father's Day (Lithuania, Switzerland)
 National Cancer Survivors Day (United States)
 Teacher's Day (Hungary)
 The Seamen's Day (Iceland)

First Monday 
 June Holiday (Lá Saoire i mí Mheitheamh) (Republic of Ireland)
 Queen's Official Birthday (New Zealand, Cook Islands, Western Australia)
 Western Australia Day

Second Thursday 
 Seersucker Thursday (United States)

Second Saturday 
 China's Cultural Heritage Day (China)
 Start of National Dairy Goat Awareness Week, ending on the third Saturday
 National Day (Montserrat, Pitcairn Islands, Saint Helena, South Georgia and South Sandwich Islands, Tristan da Cunha (United Kingdom))
 Queen's Official Birthday (United Kingdom, Tuvalu)

Second Sunday 
 Canadian Rivers Day
 Children's Day (United States)
 Father's Day (Austria, Belgium)
 Mother's Day (Luxembourg)

Third Week 
 Bike Week (Bicycle Week) (United Kingdom, Ireland)

Second Monday 
 Queen's Official Birthday (Papua New Guinea, Solomon Islands, Australia, with the exception of Western Australia, which celebrates on the first Monday)
 Flag Day (US)

Monday after the second Saturday 
 Queen's Official Birthday (Norfolk Island)

Third Friday 
 National Flip Flop Day (United States)

Third Saturday

Summer Solstice in the Northern Hemisphere 
 Day of Private Reflection (Northern Ireland)
 International Surfing Day
 International Yoga Day
 Midsummer
 World Music Day

Winter Solstice in the Southern Hemisphere 
 We Tripantu, (Mapuche, southern Chile)
 Willkakuti, an Andean-Amazonic New Year (Aymara)

Saturday between June 20–25 
 Finnish Flag Day
 Juhannus (Finland)

Saturday nearest Summer Solstice 
 Pixie Day (Ottery St. Mary, England)

Third Sunday 
 Father's Day  (Afghanistan, Albania, Antigua and Barbuda, Argentina, Aruba, Bahamas, Bahrain, Bangladesh, Barbados, Belize, Bermuda, Brunei, Cambodia, Canada, Chile, Colombia, Costa Rica, Cuba, Curaçao, Cyprus, Czech Republic, Dominica, Ecuador, Ethiopia, France, Ghana, Greece, Guatemala, Guyana, Hong Kong, Hungary, India, Ireland, Jamaica, Jordan, Japan, Kenya, Kosovo, Kuwait, Laos, Macau, Madagascar, Malaysia, Maldives, Malta, Mauritius, Mexico, Mozambique, Namibia, Netherlands, Nigeria, Oman, Pakistan, Panama, Paraguay, People's Republic of China, Peru, Philippines, Qatar, Saint Lucia, Saint Vincent and the Grenadines, Saudi Arabia, Singapore, Slovakia, South Africa, Sri Lanka, Suriname, Trinidad and Tobago, Tunisia, Turkey, United Kingdom, United States, Venezuela, Vietnam, Zambia, and Zimbabwe)

Monday Nearest to June 24 
 Discovery Day (Newfoundland and Labrador)

Last Thursday 
 National Bomb Pop Day (United States)

Friday following Third Sunday 
 Take Your Dog to Work Day (United Kingdom, United States)

Last Saturday 
 Armed Forces Day (United Kingdom)
 Inventors' and Rationalizers' Day (Russia)
 Veterans' Day (Netherlands)

Last Sunday 
 Father's Day (Haiti)
 Log Cabin Day (Michigan, United States)
 Mother's Day (Kenya)

Fixed Gregorian observances 
 May 15 – June 15 Tourette Syndrome awareness month.
 May 25 – June 25 Bicycle Month (Canada)
 May 27 – June 3 National Reconciliation Week (Australia)
 May 28 – Flag Day (Philippines) (Display of the flag in all places until June 12 is encouraged)
 May 31 – June 1 Gawai Dayak (Dayaks in Sarawak, Malaysia and West Kalimantan, Indonesia)
 June 1
 Children's Day (International), and its related observances:
 Global Day of Parents
 The Day of Protection of Children Rights (Armenia)
 Mothers' and Children's Day (Mongolia)
 Fei Fei Day (Vancouver)
 Global Day of Parents
 Independence Day (Samoa)
 Madaraka Day (Kenya)
 National Maritime Day (Mexico)
 National Tree Planting Day (Cambodia)
 Pancasila Day (Indonesia)
 President's Day (Palau)
 Victory Day (Tunisia)
 World Milk Day
 June 2
 Children's Day (North Korea)
 Civil Aviation Day (Azerbaijan)
 Coronation of King Jigme Singye Wangchuck (Bhutan)
 Day of Hristo Botev (Bulgaria)
 Decoration Day (Canada)
 Festa della Repubblica (Italy)
 International Whores' Day
 National Rocky Road Day (United States)
 National Rotisserie Chicken Day (United States)
 Social Forestry Day (Bhutan)
 June 3
 Confederate Memorial Day (Kentucky, Louisiana, and Tennessee, United States)
 Economist day (Buenos Aires, Argentina)
 Mabo Day (Australia)
 Martyr's Day (Uganda)
 National Chocolate Macaroon Day (United States)
 National Egg Day (United States)
 Opium Suppression Movement Day (Taiwan)
 World Clubfoot Day
 June 4
 Armed Forces Day/Birthday of Marshal of Finland Gustaf Mannerheim (Finland)
 Emancipation Day/Independence Day (Tonga)
 Flag Day (Estonia)
 International Day of Innocent Children Victims of Aggression
 National Cheese Day (United States)
 National Cognac Day (United States)
 National Unity Day (Hungary)
 Tiananmen Square Protests of 1989 Memorial Day (International)
 June 5
 Arbor Day (New Zealand)
 Constitution Day (Denmark)
 Constitution Day (Faroe Island)
 Day of Reclamation (Azerbaijan)
 Father's Day (Denmark)
 Indian Arrival Day (Suriname)
 Liberation Day (Seychelles)
 National Gingerbread Day (United States)
 National Moonshine Day (United States)
 President's Day (Equatorial Guinea)
 Teachers' Day (Romania)
 World Environment Day
 June 6
 Anniversary of the Normandy Landings
 Argentina's Engineering Day
 Engineer's Day (Taiwan)
 Memorial Day (South Korea)
 Korean Children's Union Foundation Day (North Korea)
 National Applesauce Day (United States)
 National Day of Sweden (Sweden)
 Queensland Day (Queensland)
 Teachers' Day (Bolivia)
 UN Russian Language Day (United Nations)
 June 7
 Anniversary of the Memorandum of the Slovak Nation (Slovakia)
 Battle of Arica Day (Arica y Parinacota Region, Chile)
 Birthday of Prince Joachim (Denmark)
 Chocolate Ice Cream Day (United States)
 Commemoration Day of St John the Forerunner (Armenian Apostolic Church)
 Flag Day (Peru)
 Journalist Day (Argentina)
 Ludi Piscatorii (Roman Empire)
 Sette Giugno (Malta)
 Union Dissolution Day (Norway)
 June 8
 Bounty Day (Norfolk Island)
 Caribbean American HIV/AIDS Awareness Day
 Engineer's Day (Peru)
 Primož Trubar Day (Slovenia)
 World Brain Tumor Day (international)
 World Oceans Day (international)
 June 9
 Anniversary of the Accession of King Abdullah II (Jordan)
 Autonomy Day (Åland)
 La Rioja Day (La Rioja)
 Murcia Day (Murcia)
 National Heroes' Day (Uganda)
 June 10
 Abolition Day (French Guiana)
 Army Day (Jordan)
 National Iced Tea Day (United States)
 Navy Day (Italy)
 Portugal Day (Portugal)
 Reconciliation Day (Republic of the Congo)
 June 11
 American Evacuation Day (Libya)
 Birthday of Prince Henrik (Denmark)
 Brazilian Navy commemorative day
 Davis Day (Cape Breton, Nova Scotia, Canada)
 Kamehameha Day (Hawaii, United States)
 National Corn on the Cob Day (United States)
 National German Chocolate Cake Day (United States)
 Student Day (Honduras)
 June 12
 Chaco Armistice Day (Paraguay)
 Dia dos Namorados (Brazil)
 Helsinki Day (Finland)
 June 12 Commemoration (Lagos State)
 Loving Day (United States)
 Independence Day (Philippines)|Philippine Independence Day
 National Peanut Butter Cookie Day (United States)
 Russia Day (Russia)
 World Day Against Child Labour (international)
 June 13
 Inventors' Day (Hungary)
 Suleimaniah City Fallen and Martyrs Day (Iraqi Kurdistan)
 June 14
 Commemoration of the Soviet Deportation related observances:
 Mourning and Commemoration Day or Leinapäev (Estonia)
 Mourning and Hope Day (Lithuania)
 Day of Memory for Repressed People (Armenia)
 Flag Day (United States)
 Freedom Day (Malawi)
 Liberation Day (Falkland Islands and South Georgia and the South Sandwich Islands)
 World Blood Donor Day (international)
 June 15
 Arbor Day (Costa Rica)
 Cagayan de Oro Charter Day (Cagayan de Oro)
 Day of Valdemar and Reunion day (Flag Day) (Denmark)
 Engineer's Day (Italy)
 Global Wind Day (international)
 Mangaia Gospel Day (Mangaia, Cook Islands)
 National Lobster Day (United States)
 National Salvation Day (Azerbaijan)
 Statehood Day (Arkansas, United States)
 June 16
 Bloomsday (Dublin, Ireland)
 Engineer's Day (Argentina)
 International Day of the African Child
 Anniversary of Martyrdom of Guru Arjan Dev (Sikhism)
 National Fudge Day (United States)
 Sussex Day (Sussex)
 Youth Day (South Africa)
 June 17
 Bunker Hill Day (Suffolk County, Massachusetts, United States)
 Father's Day (El Salvador, Guatemala)
 Icelandic National Day
 National Eat Your Vegetables Day (United States)
 Occupation of the Latvian Republic Day (Latvia)
 World Day to Combat Desertification and Drought (International)
 June 18
 Autistic Pride Day
 Human Rights Day (Azerbaijan)
 Foundation Day (Benguet)
 Human Rights Day (Azerbaijan)
 International Sushi Day
 National Day (Seychelles)
 Queen Mother's Birthday (Cambodia)
 Waterloo Day (United Kingdom)
 June 19
 Day of the Independent Hungary (Hungary)
 Feast of Forest (Palawan)
 Juneteenth (United States, especially African Americans)
 Labour Day (Trinidad and Tobago)
 Laguna Day (Laguna)
 Never Again Day (Uruguay)
 Surigao del Norte Day (Surigao del Norte)
 Surigao del Sur Day (Surigao del Sur)
 World Sickle Cell Day (International)
 World Sauntering Day
 June 20
 Day of the National Flag (Argentina)
 Festival in honor of Summanus (Roman Empire)
 Gas Sector Day (Azerbaijan)
 Martyrs' Day (Eritrea)
 National Ice Cream Soda Day (United States)
 National Kouign Amann Day (United States)
 National Vanilla Milkshake Day (United States)
 West Virginia Day (West Virginia)
 World Refugee Day (International)
 June 21
 Day of the Martyrs (Togo)
 Father's Day (Egypt, Lebanon, Jordan, Syria, Uganda, United Arab Emirates)
 Go Skateboarding Day
 National Indigenous Peoples Day (Canada)
 National Day (Greenland)
 National Peaches 'N' Cream Day (United States)
 World Humanist Day (Humanism)
 World Hydrography Day
 June 22
 Anti-Fascist Struggle Day (Croatia)
 Day of Remembrance of the Victims of the Great Patriotic War (Belarus)
 Father's Day  (Guernsey, Isle of Man, and Jersey)
 Teachers' Day (El Salvador)
 June 23
 Father's Day (Nicaragua, Poland)
 Grand Duke's Official Birthday (Luxembourg)
 International Widows Day (international)
 National Day of Remembrance for Victims of Terrorism (Canada)
 Okinawa Memorial Day (Okinawa, Japan)
 Saint John's Eve (Roman Catholic Church, Europe):
 Bonfires of Saint John (Spain)
 First day of Golowan Festival (Cornwall)
 Jaaniõhtu (Estonia)
 Jāņi (Latvia)
 Last day of Drăgaica fair (Buzău, Romania)
 Festa de São João do Porto (Portugal)
 United Nations Public Service Day (International)
 Victory Day (Estonia)
 June 24
 Army Day or Battle of Carabobo Day (Venezuela)
 Bannockburn Day (Scotland)
 Day of the Caboclo (Amazonas, Brazil)
 Saint John's Day, second day of celebrations.
 Enyovden (Bulgaria)
 Jaanipäev (Estonia)
 Jāņi (Latvia)
 Jónsmessa (Iceland)
 Midsummer Day (England)
 Saint Jonas' Festival or Joninės (Lithuania)
 Saint-Jean-Baptiste Day (Quebec, Canada)
 Sânziene (western Carpathian Mountains of Romania)
 Youth Day (Ukraine)
 June 25
 Arbor Day (Philippines)
 Independence Day (Mozambique)
 National Catfish Day (United States)
 Statehood Day (Croatia)
 Statehood Day (Slovenia)
 Statehood Day (Virginia)
 Teacher's Day (Guatemala)
 World Vitiligo Day
 June 26
 Army and Navy Day (Azerbaijan)
 Flag Day (Romania)
 Independence Day (Madagascar)
 International Day against Drug Abuse and Illicit Trafficking (International)
 International Day in Support of Victims of Torture (International)
 National Chocolate Pudding Day (United States)
 Ratcatcher's Day (Hamelin, Germany)
 Sunthorn Phu Day (Thailand)
 World Refrigeration Day (International)
 June 27
 Canadian Multiculturalism Day (Canada)
 Day of Turkmen Workers of Culture and Art (Turkmenistan)
 Helen Keller Day (United States)
 Independence Day (Djibouti)
 Mixed Race Day (Brazil)
 National HIV Testing Day (United States)
 PTSD Awareness Day (United States)
 Seven Sleepers Day or Siebenschläfertag (Germany)
 Unity Day (Tajikistan)
 June 28
 Carolina Day (South Carolina, United States)
 Constitution Day (Ukraine)
 Family Day (Vietnam)
 National Ceviche Day (United States)
 National Tapioca Day (United States)
 Poznań Remembrance Day (Poland)
 Soviet Occupation Day, Moldova
 Stonewall Riots Anniversary (United States)
 Tau Day
 Vidovdan (Eastern Orthodox Church)
 June 29
 Feast of Saints Peter and Paul
 Haro Wine Festival (Haro, La Rioja, Spain)
 Engineer's Day (Ecuador)
 Fallen Soldiers' and Missing in Action Memorial Day
 Independence Day (Seychelles)
 Veterans' Day (Netherlands)
 June 30
 Armed Forces Day (Guatemala)
 General Prayer Day (Central African Republic)
 Independence Day (Democratic Republic of the Congo)
 Navy Day (Israel)
 Philippine–Spanish Friendship Day (Philippines)
 Revolution Day (Sudan)

June symbols 
   June's birthstones are pearl, alexandrite and moonstone.
  The birth flowers are rose and honeysuckle.
 The zodiac signs for the month of June are Gemini (until June 20) and Cancer (from June 21 onwards). Both of these dates are for United States Eastern Daylight Time. For the world UT/GMT the dates are 19–20.

References 

 
06